The Royal Household Cricket Club is a cricket team representing the Royal Households of the United Kingdom. The club has a cricket field at Frogmore in Windsor, within the Home Park of Windsor Castle. It was founded in 1905 by King Edward VII, who was a keen supporter and granted the club permission to use the royal racing colours of scarlet, purple and gold. The club also uses the royal crown as its emblem. It plays a full list of fixtures each season, mostly playing on weekends at its Frogmore ground.

Although the club's members are mostly Royal Household staff supplemented by local cricketers if they are short-handed, members of the British royal family have also played for it. In 1905, two future kings, Edward VIII (then Prince Edward) and George VI (then Prince Albert) played on opposite sides in a match between the club and Eton College. More recently, Prince Philip has played for the club and served as its President since 1953 until his death. Queen Elizabeth II was the club's Patron.

References

1905 establishments in England
English club cricket teams
Organisations based in England with royal patronage
Cricket clubs established in 1905
Sports organizations established in 1905
Home Park, Windsor